Aleksey Alekseyevich Vodyagin (10 January 1925 – 21 April 1991) was a Russian footballer and coach.

In 1945, he began his playing career at the club CDKA Moscow, but was unable to break into the first team and next year he moved to second division team Burevestnik Moscow. Before the start of the season in 1947 however, he returned to CDKA and played there until 1953 when he moved to FC Dynamo Moscow. In 1955, he ended his playing career at the club FC Krylia Sovetov Samara. He was the winner of the USSR Cup in 1948, 1951 and 1953.

After retiring, he became a football coach from 1956 and in the years 1977-1989 served as a coach in Dinamo Moscow Football School. He died in Moscow on April 21, 1991.

References

1925 births
1991 deaths
FC Dynamo Moscow players
PFC Krylia Sovetov Samara players
FC Spartak Moscow players
Soviet Top League players
FC Zorya Luhansk managers
FC Khimik-Arsenal managers
MFC Mykolaiv managers
PFC CSKA Moscow players
Russian football managers
Soviet football managers
Soviet footballers
Association football midfielders